The 1978 Ice Hockey World Championships took place in Prague, Czechoslovakia from 26 April to 14 May. Eight teams took part, with each team playing each other once in the first round, and then the four best teams meeting in a new round. This was the 45th World Championships, and also the 56th European Championships.  The USSR won for the fifteenth time, narrowly defeating the incumbent Czechoslovaks.

On the final day, there was essentially a gold medal game, and a bronze medal game.  The Soviets played the Czechoslovaks and needed to win by at least two to win the Championship. They took a three nothing lead, and hung to win by two, capturing gold by being even head-to-head with the Czechoslovaks, but having a cumulative two goal advantage against everyone else.  Canada and Sweden came into the final game even, so the winner would claim the bronze.  Pat Hickey scored with a minute left in the game to give Canada a three to two victory, and the medal.

Because of the allowance of professionals from the NHL into the tournament, a peculiar (and new) situation arose during this year's tournament.  The Minnesota North Stars had players representing Canada (2), Sweden (3), and the United States (4).

World Championship Group A (Czechoslovakia)

First round

Final Round 1–4 place

Consolation round 5–8 place

East Germany was relegated to Group B.

World Championship Group B (Yugoslavia)
Played in Belgrade 17–26 March.

Undefeated Poland was promoted to Group A, and both Italy and Yugoslavia were relegated to Group C.

World Championship Group C (Spain)
Played in the Canary Islands (Las Palmas) 10–19 March.

The Netherlands and Austria were both promoted to Group B.  China and Denmark also ended up being promoted to alleviate a political situation between the Chinese and the South Koreans and to address the IIHF missing that Austria should have been disqualified for using Pentti Hyytiäinen.Pentti Hytiainen profile

Ranking and statistics

Tournament Awards
Best players selected by the directorate:
Best Goaltender:       Jiří Holeček
Best Defenceman:       Viacheslav Fetisov
Best Forward:          Marcel Dionne
Media All-Star Team:
Goaltender:  Jiří Holeček
Defence:  Jiří Bubla,  Viacheslav Fetisov
Forwards:  Ivan Hlinka,  Sergei Kapustin,  Alexander Maltsev

Final standings
The final standings of the tournament according to IIHF:

European championships final standings
The final standings of the European championships according to IIHF:

Citations

References
Complete results

IIHF Men's World Ice Hockey Championships
World Championships
World
1978
World Ice Hockey Championships
World Ice Hockey Championships
Sports competitions in Prague
1970s in Prague
March 1978 sports events in Europe
International ice hockey competitions hosted by Yugoslavia
International ice hockey competitions hosted by Spain
1970s in Belgrade
International sports competitions in Belgrade
Sport in Las Palmas
World Ice Hockey Championships
World Ice Hockey Championships
World Ice Hockey Championships